G7 is the Group of Seven, a group of seven industrialized nations, formed by Canada, France, Germany, Italy, Japan, the United Kingdom and the United States.

G7 or G.VII may also refer to:

Military
 G7 howitzer, a light howitzer developed by the South African arms company Denel
 Gotha G.VII, a 1918 German bomber aircraft 
 HMCS Athabaskan (G07), a 1941 destroyer of the Canadian Navy
 Spanish submarine G-7, a 1947 submarine

Music
 G7 (guitar software), a music notation program for guitarists & songwriters
 G7, a seventh chord in music
 G7 Welcoming Committee Records, a record label

Technology
 G7 Series, gaming laptops in the Dell G Series
 Canon PowerShot G7, a prosumer digital camera
 LG G7, a smartphone by LG Electronics
 Logitech Laser G7, a computer mouse
 Moto G7, a series of Motorola smartphones
 G7 Method (grayscale plus seven colors), a printing industry specification

Transportation
 G7, the Cityrail train set involved in the Waterfall rail accident
 G7 Beijing–Ürümqi Expressway, an expressway in China
 Gandalf Airlines (IATA airline designator), Italy
 GoJet Airlines (IATA airline designator), US
 HSR-350x (project name G7), a Korean high-speed rail prototype train

Other uses
 G7 coffee, an instant coffee brand of Trung Nguyên
 Group of Seven (artists), group of Canadian artists
 G7 Spectral Class of star.

See also
 Group of Eight (G8), the same group before the expulsion of Russia in 2014
 7G (disambiguation)
 Group of Seven (disambiguation)
 G7a torpedo, steam-powered
 G7e torpedo, electric-powered
 G7es torpedo, a series of torpedoes used by the German Kriegsmarine during World War II